Chris D. Martinez is a Filipino film screenwriter, director, producer and playwright. He has won Carlos Palanca Memorial Awards for Literature for his plays. He is the author of the book Laugh Trip.

Works

As film director
 Here Comes the Groom (2023)
 Here Comes the Bride (2010)
 My Valentine Girls (2011)
 Temptation Island (2011)
 Shake, Rattle & Roll XIII (2011)
 I Do Bidoo Bidoo: Heto nAPO Sila! (2012)
 Status: It's Complicated (2013)
 Kimmy Dora: Ang Kiyemeng Prequel (2013)
 The Gifted (2014)
 You're Still the One (2015)
 Lumayo Ka Nga Sa Akin (2016)
 Working Beks (2016)
 Ang Babae sa Septic Tank 2: Forever is Not Enough (2016)
 Extra Service (2017)
 Meant to Beh (2017)

Awards
 2013: Carlos Palanca Award for “Ang Singsing-Pari sa Pisara”

References

Filipino dramatists and playwrights
Filipino film directors
Place of birth missing (living people)
Year of birth missing (living people)
Living people